The Philharmonia Moment Musical (PMM) is a non-professional symphony orchestra in Taiwan. It was founded in February 1999 by the Taiwanese conductor Po-Po Chiang. From 2002, PMM was selected as quality group of performing arts by Taiwan Council for Cultural Affairs in five consecutive years.

Affiliates 
 Youth Moment Musical - youth orchestra
 A Capella Moment Musical - women's choir

See also
 List of symphony orchestras in Taiwan

External links 
 

Taiwanese orchestras
Musical groups established in 1999
1999 establishments in Taiwan